Haemactis is a genus of skippers in the family Hesperiidae.

Species
Recognised species in the genus Haemactis include:
 Haemactis sanguinalis (Westwood, [1852])

References

Natural History Museum Lepidoptera genus database

Pyrginae
Hesperiidae genera
Taxa named by Paul Mabille